The Ministry of Family Welfare and Demography is a ministry in the Government of Serbia, created by a vote of the National Assembly of Serbia on 26 October 2020. Ratko Dmitrović was appointed as minister two days later when Ana Brnabić's second cabinet was constituted and continues to serve in the role as of 2022.

At the time of the ministry's creation, it was noted that its purpose was to address issues relating to "family protection, marriage, population policy, family planning, the promotion and development of demographic policy, birth rate, and quality and life expectancy."

Dmitrović has said that Serbia's low birth rate should be targeted by both material incentives and by what he describes as promoting "the cult of the family in the most positive sense of the word." The ministry issued a statement in November 2021 that every fifth inhabitant of Serbia is over sixty-five and that every seventh is under fourteen.

Secretary of State and assistant ministers
There is currently one secretary of state in the ministry: Milka Milovanović Minić. In addition, Marija Leković and Aleksandra Čamagić are assistant ministers.

Sectors of the ministry
There are currently four sectors in the ministry of family welfare and demography:

Planning and Improvement of Families and Children, Quality of Life, Extension of Life and Family Legal Protection
Demography, Internal Migration and Cooperation with Local Self-Government
Population Policy, Birth Rate Policy and Reproductive Health
International Cooperation, European Integration and Projects

List of ministers

References

External links
 

Family Welfare and Demography
2020 establishments in Serbia
Ministries established in 2020